Dionatan Chaves da Silva (born 23 January 1993), commonly known as Natan, is a Brazilian footballer who plays as an attacking midfielder.

Club career
Natan was born in Três de Maio, Rio Grande do Sul. After representing Galícia, São Paulo and Vitória as a youth, he joined Grêmio on 19 August 2013, being assigned to the under-20s.

In January 2014 Natan was called up to Grêmio's first team, but was loaned to Anápolis shortly after. He made his debut as a senior with the latter team on 9 February, coming on as a half-time substitute in a 1–1 away draw against Aparecidense.

On 7 April 2014 Natan was loaned to Série C club ASA. He appeared sparingly with the club, and was subsequently released by Grêmio in the end of the year after his contract expired.

On 28 January 2015 Natan signed for Boa Esporte, and made his debut for the club four days later, again from the bench in a 1–2 Campeonato Mineiro loss at URT. On 8 February 2015 he scored his first professional goals, netting a brace in a 2–0 home win against Democrata-GV.

Despite being a regular with the club in Mineirão, Natan failed to make an appearance in Série B. On 30 November 2015, he moved to Portuguesa.

References

External links

Naten at ZeroZero

1993 births
Living people
Sportspeople from Rio Grande do Sul
Brazilian footballers
Brazilian expatriate footballers
Association football midfielders
Campeonato Brasileiro Série C players
Grêmio Foot-Ball Porto Alegrense players
Anápolis Futebol Clube players
Agremiação Sportiva Arapiraquense players
Boa Esporte Clube players
Associação Portuguesa de Desportos players
Fortaleza Esporte Clube players
Oeste Futebol Clube players
Esporte Clube Taubaté players
FC Krymteplytsia Molodizhne players
Clube Esportivo Aimoré players
Brazilian expatriate sportspeople in Ukraine
Expatriate footballers in Ukraine